Klimkovo is the name of several rural localities in Russia:
Klimkovo, Malovishersky District, Novgorod Oblast, a village in Burginskoye Settlement of Malovishersky District of Novgorod Oblast
Klimkovo, Moshenskoy District, Novgorod Oblast, a village in Orekhovskoye Settlement of Moshenskoy District of Novgorod Oblast
Klimkovo, Vladimir Oblast, a village in Kirzhachsky District of Vladimir Oblast
Klimkovo, Vologda Oblast, a village in Ploskovsky Selsoviet of Gryazovetsky District of Vologda Oblast

References